San Francesco, once known as San Pietro is a Roman Catholic located in the town of Civita Castellana, province of Viterbo, region of Lazio, Italy.

History
A church at the site, was erected in the 13th-century, but the present church arrived in its present form, after two reconstructions; the latest in the 18th-century. In the past, the church was adjacent to a Franciscan convent, and the wooden choir stalls for the friars are still evident in the apse of the church. The church has six side altars. Among the works are a depiction of San Bernardino of Siena by Sano di Pietro in the first altar on the left; and an Adoration of the Christ Child by Antoniazzo Romano in the second altar on the right. The main tabernacle is attributed to Agostino di Duccio and it shelters a 1531 altarpiece.

References

13th-century Roman Catholic church buildings in Italy
18th-century Roman Catholic church buildings in Italy
Roman Catholic churches in Viterbo